The 1977 PSA Men's Uniroyal World Open Squash Championship is the men's edition of the 1977 World Open, which serves as the individual world championship for squash players. The event took place at Brahma Lodge in Adelaide, Australia from 11 October to 21 October 1977. Geoff Hunt won his second World Open title, defeating Qamar Zaman in the final.

Seeds

Draw and results

First round

Third Place Play Off
The only time a third place play off took place in World Open history was in 1977.

See also
PSA World Open

References

External links
World Squash History

M
World Squash Championships
Squash tournaments in Australia
1977 in Australian sport
Sports competitions in Adelaide
International sports competitions hosted by Australia
October 1977 sports events in Australia
1970s in Adelaide